State Highway 16 (SH 16) is a State Highway in Kerala that starts from 
Aluva and ends at Northern outlet road. The highway is 57.3 km long.

The Route Map
Aluva - Ponjasseri - Kizhakkambalam road starts - Mannoor - Ponjasseri road ends - Perumbavoor  - MC Road crosses - Koovapady - (Kuruppumpady - Kootickal) Road Crosses - (Paneli - Muvattupuzha) road crosses - Kothamangalam - Neriamangalam junction - Cheeyappara waterfalls - Deviyar bridge - Adimali junction (Adimali - Chithirapuram road starts) - Kallar river - Pallivasal - Munnar town - Northern outlet road starts

See also
 Roads
 List of State Highways in Kerala

References

Roads in Ernakulam district
Roads in Idukki district